King, Queen, Knave is a 1972 West German comedy film directed by Jerzy Skolimowski, based on the novel of the same name by Vladimir Nabokov.

Plot
Adopted by his rich Uncle Charles and taken to Germany on the death of his parents, the inept British teenager Frank is introduced to the free-wheeling 1970s European lifestyle and begins to fantasise about his uncle's glamorous Italian wife Martha. She seduces Frank and then tries to persuade him to kill her husband so that they can inherit his money. However, though the idea is to drown Charles from a rowing boat, they all fall into the water and she drowns by accident instead, leaving uncle and nephew to resume the friendly relations that she had disrupted.

Cast

Production
David Wolper had bought the screen rights to Nabokov's novel immediately after its 1968 publication, but Jerzy Skolimowski was not hired to direct the film until 1971. The film was shot at the Bavaria Studios in Munich, West Germany, and on location in London. Starring David Niven, Gina Lollobrigida and John Moulder-Brown, it was nominated unsuccessfully for the Palme d’Or at the Cannes Film Festival in 1972 and was not released in the US until 1978.

Reception
Although Jonathan Rosenbaum personally liked King, Queen, Knave at its first showing, he recorded that it "probably elicited more boos and jeers than anything else I saw at Cannes". Understandably, he thought, if the audience was expecting a straight transposition of the novel. Later, in an interview given in 1990, Jerzy Skolimowski described the film as the worst of his career and an artistic disaster from which he could not recover for a long time.

However, Nabokov's novels have proved notoriously difficult to film because of their stylistic and experimental qualities and Ewa Mazierska has argued that the subtleties of Skolimowski's adaptation have been overlooked. In her view the film was "an exceptionally good rendition of Nabokov’s novel" from the point of view of trying to capture its literary characteristics rather than remaining faithful to the narrative itself. Where Skolimowski departs from its spirit in particular is in making of the film a vehicle to criticise capitalism rather than (as in Nabokov's own revision of his novel) a criticism of the conditions out of which Fascism was to develop. The superficiality of the characters, for instance, is indirectly suggested by a musical soundtrack in which well-known musical motifs are badly played. Another aspect of the film's characterisation is the further shift in emphasis from the original novel, treating Martha simply as the disposable means by which Frank comes of age.

Time Out has also defended the "surreal black comedy" as "the most unjustly underrated of all Skolimowski's films" and quotes Tom Milne's description of it as "the most Nabokovian film the cinema has thrown up to date".

References

External links

1972 films
1972 comedy films
German comedy films
English-language German films
Films directed by Jerzy Skolimowski
West German films
Films based on Russian novels
Films based on works by Vladimir Nabokov
Films scored by Stanley Myers
The Wolper Organization films
Films set in Munich
Films set in West Germany
Bavaria Film films
Films shot at Bavaria Studios
1970s English-language films
1970s German films